Pachystola fuliginosa is a species of beetle in the family Cerambycidae. It was described by Chevrolat in 1858. It is known from Nigeria.

References

Pachystolini
Beetles described in 1858